Ride the Wild Surf is a 1964 American romantic drama film. It was filmed in 1963 and distributed in 1964. Unlike the beach party movies of the era, this was a departure from the typical Hollywood approach to surfing as it was a drama, not a comedy. It is known for its exceptional big wave surf footage – a common sight in surf movies of the time, but a rarity in Hollywood films. Likewise, the film has only one pop song – the titular Jan and Dean track, which is heard once, at the end of the film.

Tom Lisanti wrote the movie "stands head and shoulders above all the sixties beach party movies... It makes an honorable attempt to portray surfers and the sport of surfing sincerely and to showcase the big waves of the north shore of Hawaii. There are no singing surfers or goofy motorcycle gang members... [It is] the best Hollywood surf movie of the sixties."

Plot
The story follows surfers Jody Wallis (Fabian), Steamer Lane (Tab Hunter), and Chase Colton (Peter Brown), who come to Hawaii's Oahu Island to ride the world's biggest waves and compete against surfers from all over the world.

Steamer falls in love with Lily Kilua (Susan Hart), whose mother objects to the romance because she considers surfers to be "beach bums," since her husband—a surfer—left home and family to follow the surf circuit. Self-described college dropout and surf bum Jody falls for the demure Brie Matthews (Shelley Fabares), who challenges him to return to college. In the case of the relatively strait-laced Chase, he finds himself pursued by the adventurous Augie Poole (Barbara Eden).

The main story, though, is the challenge to surf the monster waves at Waimea Bay, and fit in among the champion surfers there such as Eskimo (James Mitchum).  Despite conflicts, injuries and rocky romances, Wallis, Chase and Steamer prove themselves brave—or crazy—enough to try to be the last one to ride in the highest wave.

Cast
Fabian as Jody Wallis
Tab Hunter as Steamer Lane
Peter Brown as Chase Colton
Shelley Fabares as Brie Matthews
Barbara Eden as Augie Poole
Susan Hart as Lily Kilua
Anthony Hayes as Frank Decker
Murray Rose as Swag

Production

Development
The film was written by Jo and Art Napoleon. From late 1963 to early 1964, they traveled with cinematographer Joseph Biroc to Hawaii to shoot surf footage of surfers.  They filmed at Haleiwa, Sunset Beach, Pipeline and Waimea Bay. The surfers included Mickey Dora (who doubled for Jody, Fabian's character), Phil Edwards, Rusty Miller, and Mark Hyson. Surfer Greg "Da Bull" Noll was so impressive that the Napoleons created the character Eskimo based on footage featuring him.

They then returned to Hollywood to write the script. They pitched the project to Columbia who agreed to finance. It was originally going to be called Surfing Wild and star Glenn Corbett.

Casting
Jan and Dean both were scheduled to appear in the film, supporting Fabian, who was borrowed from 20th Century Fox. Jan and Dean  were pulled by Columbia after Dean’s friend, Barry Keenan, became involved in the kidnapping of Frank Sinatra, Jr. in December 1963. They were replaced by Tab Hunter and Peter Brown.

Hunter made the film after the Broadway flop The Milk Train Doesn't Stop Here Anymore. He later said it "was cut from the same cloth as the movies I made with Natalie [Wood] in the mid-fifties. Only this time it was 'Dad, can I have the big surfboard tonight?' " Hunter drew inspiration for his performance from his brother Walt who was a surfer.

Susan Hart was cast after impressing Mike Frankovich of Hollywood in some TV appearances she had made; she dyed her hair black for her role. Hart was seen by James H. Nicholson of AIP in the film, which led to him signing her to that studio and later marrying her.

Eden was cast in February 1964. Shelley Fabares was known for The Donna Reed Show and this was her first movie.

Fabian had never surfed before and spent three weeks learning. Australian Olympic swimming champion Murray Rose was given a small role.

The surfboards used in this film were by Phil of Downey, California - aka Phil Sauers, the maker of "Surfboards of the Stars." Sauers is portrayed in Ride the Wild Surf as a character, played by Mark LaBuse. Sauers was also the stunt coordinator for the film.

Of the three surfer leads, raven-haired Peter Brown was made into a blonde by makeup artist Ben Lane (to match the hair of Brown’s surfing double – and to keep all three men from being brunets), which required his girlfriend, the blonde Barbara Eden, to have auburn hair; likewise the dark-haired Shelley Fabares – who is paired with the dark-haired Fabian, became a Scandinavian blonde.  Susan Hart’s black hair was sufficiently different from her male counterpart Tab Hunter’s that no change was required.

The stunt surfers were given swim trunks that matched their movie star counterparts, except for star James Mitchum, who was instead given trunks that replicated his stunt double Greg Noll’s famous black & white "jailhouse stripe" boardshorts. Hunter and Brown dyed their hair to match the stuntmen. "A rare case of the stars doubling for the stunt men," wrote Hunter later.

Shooting
Unlike most of the Hollywood beach movies – whose location was Southern California – Ride the Wild Surf was filmed in Hawaii at a time when environmental conditions created exceptionally large waves.  In November and December 1962, Waimea broke often.  The jet stream had altered its course temporarily and huge west swell surfs became common all the way through the following February, which was when Columbia arrived to shoot the movie.

Most of the film was shot on Oahu.

Art and Jo Napoleon shot the movie for three weeks in March 1964. Filming was difficult and plagued with a series of problems. In March 1964 Columbia fired Art Napoleon. The production was shut down and Don Taylor flown out to replace Napoleon.

Taylor's mother died during the shoot so Phil Karlson returned for three days. Tab Hunter had enjoyed working with Karlson on Gunman's Walk and arranged for the schedule to be changed so Karlson could direct a scene where Hunter's character argues with Hart's character's mother. "It was the only half decent scene I had," wrote Hunter. "Karlson was a true pro and I was happy to work with him again, however briefly."

Surfers Miki Dora, Greg Noll and Butch Van Artsdalen performed a large part of the surfing seen in the film.

"It was extremely hard to photograph," said Fabian. "Boats can't ride along with the big waves when they break and how do you hit your mark in the water? Everyone in the cast had coral cuts; live coral is infectious when embedded in the flesh. The scar on my foot will be with me for life."

Hunter said the film "may not have had dialogue by Tennessee Williams but it was work and I was glad to have it. Some of my callow colleagues however had yet to learn how fleeting it all can be. Making a film about the hang loose carefree surfing life was an excuse for some of them to waste time and money clowning around, intentionally screwing up takes." Hunter says he scolded the cast, causing the crew to applaud. "I was now officially the Old Fart on set," he wrote later.

Footage of Hunter, Brown and Fabian on surfboards was shot on the Columbia backlot, using back projection. "It's amazing to think anyone was taken in by this pasted-together version of surfer culture," said Hunter.

Music
The soundtrack was composed by Stu Phillips - it was the third film score he had ever composed.  Phillips also founded Colpix Records and produced hits for Nina Simone, The Skyliners and one of Ride the Wild Surf'''s stars, Shelley Fabares.

The title song was written by Jan Berry, Brian Wilson, and Roger Christian, and recorded by Jan & Dean becoming a Top 20 national hit, reaching Billboard's #16 spot.

Movie tie-in
Although the film featured much music, it had only one song - the 1:07-long version of "Ride The Wild Surf". A 12-inch LP was released by Liberty Records in connection with the film. The cover, rendered in a Mondrian style collage, featured a photo of Jan & Dean accompanied by 11 photos from the film, with copy written to make it appear as though it was a soundtrack album: “Jan & Dean Sing the Original Soundtrack Recording of the Title Song from 'Ride the Wild Surf'.” The notes on the back cover featured an endorsement written by the film's star, Shelley Fabares. Of the 12 tracks on the LP, only one was from the film: a 2:13-long version of the title song.

Reception
Box Office
Hunter called the film "a big hit" and meant he was associated with beach movies of the 1950s and 1960s even though he only made one "and it's not that hot".

Critical
The New York Times called it "unexpectedly enjoyable vacation fare". Joan Didion writing in Vogue called it "a first rate surfer" movie adding "there are few other opportunities in a bleak city autumn to spend forty unbroken minutes watching immense translucent combers rise and curl in the sunlight".

The Los Angeles Times called it "wholesome, routine entertainment."

See alsoBlue Crush, a 2002 film about three surfer girls living in HawaiiNorth Shore'', a 1987 film about a surfer from Arizona who learns to surf in Hawaii

References

Sources

External links
 
 

1964 films
1964 romantic drama films
1960s teen films
Films directed by Don Taylor
American surfing films
Columbia Pictures films
Beach party films
Jan and Dean songs
Songs written by Roger Christian (songwriter)
Songs written by Jan Berry
Films set on beaches
Films set in Hawaii
Films shot in Hawaii
Films scored by Stu Phillips
1960s English-language films
1960s American films